Jerome (– 30 September 420), also known as Jerome of Stridon, was a Christian priest, confessor, theologian, and historian; he is commonly known as Saint Jerome.

Jerome was born at Stridon, a village near Emona on the border of Dalmatia and Pannonia. He is best known for his translation of the Bible into Latin (the translation that became known as the Vulgate) and his commentaries on the whole Bible. Jerome attempted to create a translation of the Old Testament based on a Hebrew version, rather than the Septuagint, as Latin Bible translations used to be performed before him. His list of writings is extensive, and beside his biblical works, he wrote polemical and historical essays, always from a theologian's perspective.

Jerome was known for his teachings on Christian moral life, especially to those living in cosmopolitan centers such as Rome. In many cases, he focused his attention on the lives of women and identified how a woman devoted to Jesus should live her life. This focus stemmed from his close patron relationships with several prominent female ascetics who were members of affluent senatorial families.

Due to Jerome's work, he is recognised as a saint and Doctor of the Church by the Catholic Church, and as a saint in the Eastern Orthodox Church, the Lutheran Church, and the Anglican Communion. His feast day is 30 September (Gregorian calendar).

Biography

Early life 
Eusebius Sophronius Hieronymus was born at Stridon around 342–347 AD. He was of Illyrian ancestry, although whether he was able to speak the Illyrian language is a subject of controversy. He was not baptized until about 360–369 in Rome, where he had gone with his friend Bonosus of Sardica to pursue rhetorical and philosophical studies. (This Bonosus may or may not have been the same Bonosus whom Jerome identifies as his friend who went to live as a hermit on an island in the Adriatic.) Jerome studied under the grammarian Aelius Donatus. There he learned Latin and at least some Greek, though he probably did not yet acquire the familiarity with Greek literature that he later claimed to have acquired as a schoolboy.

As a student, Jerome engaged in the superficial escapades and sexual experimentation of students in Rome; he indulged himself quite casually but he suffered terrible bouts of guilt afterwards. To appease his conscience, on Sundays he visited the sepulchers of the martyrs and the Apostles in the catacombs. This experience reminded him of the terrors of Hell:

Often I would find myself entering those crypts, deep dug in the earth, with their walls on either side lined with the bodies of the dead, where everything was so dark that almost it seemed as though the Psalmist's words were fulfilled, Let them go down quick into Hell. Here and there the light, not entering in through windows, but filtering down from above through shafts, relieved the horror of the darkness. But again, as soon as you found yourself cautiously moving forward, the black night closed around and there came to my mind the line of Virgil, "Horror ubique animos, simul ipsa silentia terrent".

His quote from Virgil reads: "On all sides round horror spread wide; the very silence breathed a terror on my soul".

Conversion to Christianity 

Although at first afraid of Christianity, he eventually converted.

Seized with a desire for a life of ascetic penance, Jerome went for a time to the desert of Chalcis, to the southeast of Antioch, known as the "Syrian Thebaid" from the number of eremites inhabiting it. During this period, he seems to have found time for studying and writing. He made his first attempt to learn Hebrew under the guidance of a converted Jew; and he seems to have been in correspondence with Jewish Christians in Antioch. Around this time he had copied for him a Hebrew Gospel, of which fragments are preserved in his notes. It is known today as the Gospel of the Hebrews which the Nazarenes considered to be the true Gospel of Matthew. Jerome translated parts of this Hebrew Gospel into Greek.

As protege of Pope Damasus I, Jerome was given duties in Rome, and he undertook a revision of the Vetus Latina Gospels based on Greek manuscripts. He also updated the Psalter containing the Book of Psalms then in use in Rome, based on the Septuagint.

Throughout his epistles he shows himself to be surrounded by women and united with close ties; it is estimated that 40% of his epistles were addressed to someone of the female sex and, at the time, he was criticized for it.

Even in his time, Jerome noted Porphyry’s accusation that the Christian communities were run by women and that the favor of the ladies decided who could accede to the dignity of the priesthood.

In Rome, Jerome was surrounded by a circle of well-born and well-educated women, including some from the noblest patrician families. Among these women were such as the widows Lea, Marcella, and Paula, and Paula's daughters Blaesilla and Eustochium. The resulting inclination of these women towards the monastic life, away from the indulgent lasciviousness in Rome, and his unsparing criticism of the secular clergy of Rome, brought a growing hostility against him among the Roman clergy and their supporters. Soon after the death of his patron Pope Damasus I on 10 December 384, Jerome was forced to leave his position at Rome after an inquiry was brought up by the Roman clergy into allegations that he had an improper relationship with the widow Paula. Still, his writings were highly regarded by women who were attempting to maintain vows of becoming consecrated virgins. His letters were widely read and distributed throughout the Christian empire and it is clear through his writing that he knew these virgin women were not his only audience.

Additionally, Jerome's condemnation of Blaesilla's hedonistic lifestyle in Rome had led her to adopt ascetic practices, but it affected her health and worsened her physical weakness to the point that she died just four months after starting to follow his instructions; much of the Roman populace were outraged at Jerome for causing the premature death of such a lively young woman. Additionally, his insistence to Paula that Blaesilla should not be mourned and complaints that her grief was excessive were seen as heartless, which further polarised Roman opinion against him.

Works

Translation of the Bible (382–405) 

Jerome was a scholar at a time when that statement implied a fluency in Greek. He knew some Hebrew when he started his translation project, but moved to Jerusalem to strengthen his grip on Jewish scripture commentary. A wealthy Roman aristocrat, Paula, funded his stay in a monastery in Bethlehem and he completed his translation there. He began in 382 by correcting the existing Latin-language version of the New Testament, commonly referred to as the Vetus Latina. By 390 he turned to translating the Hebrew Bible from the original Hebrew, having previously translated portions from the Septuagint which came from Alexandria. He believed that the mainstream Rabbinical Judaism had rejected the Septuagint as invalid Jewish scriptural texts because of what were ascertained as mistranslations along with its Hellenistic heretical elements. He completed this work by 405. Prior to Jerome's Vulgate, all Latin translations of the Old Testament were based on the Septuagint, not the Hebrew. Jerome's decision to use a Hebrew text instead of the previous-translated Septuagint went against the advice of most other Christians, including Augustine, who thought the Septuagint inspired. Modern scholarship, however, has sometimes cast doubts on the actual quality of Jerome's Hebrew knowledge. Many modern scholars believe that the Greek Hexapla is the main source for Jerome's "iuxta Hebraeos" (i.e. "close to the Hebrews", "immediately following the Hebrews") translation of the Old Testament. However, detailed studies have shown that to a considerable degree Jerome was a competent Hebraist.

Commentaries (405–420) 

For the next 15 years, until he died, Jerome produced a number of commentaries on Scripture, often explaining his translation choices in using the original Hebrew rather than suspect translations. His patristic commentaries align closely with Jewish tradition, and he indulges in allegorical and mystical subtleties after the manner of Philo and the Alexandrian school. Unlike his contemporaries, he emphasizes the difference between the Hebrew Bible "Apocrypha" and the Hebraica veritas of the protocanonical books. In his Vulgate's prologues, he describes some portions of books in the Septuagint that were not found in the Hebrew as being non-canonical (he called them apocrypha); for Baruch, he mentions by name in his Prologue to Jeremiah and notes that it is neither read nor held among the Hebrews, but does not explicitly call it apocryphal or "not in the canon". His Preface to the Books of Samuel and Kings (commonly called the Helmeted Preface) includes the following statement:
This preface to the Scriptures may serve as a "helmeted" introduction to all the books which we turn from Hebrew into Latin, so that we may be assured that what is not found in our list must be placed amongst the Apocryphal writings. Wisdom, therefore, which generally bears the name of Solomon, and the book of Jesus, the Son of Sirach, and Judith, and Tobias, and the Shepherd are not in the canon. The first book of Maccabees I have found to be Hebrew, the second is Greek, as can be proved from the very style.

Jerome's commentaries fall into three groups:

Historical and hagiographic writings

Description of vitamin A deficiency 
The following passage, taken from Jerome's Life of St. Hilarion which was written about 392, appears to be the earliest account of the etiology, symptoms and cure of severe vitamin A deficiency:

Letters 

Jerome's letters or epistles, both by the great variety of their subjects and by their qualities of style, form an important portion of his literary remains. Whether he is discussing problems of scholarship, or reasoning on cases of conscience, comforting the afflicted, or saying pleasant things to his friends, scourging the vices and corruptions of the time and against sexual immorality among the clergy, exhorting to the ascetic life and renunciation of the world, or debating his theological opponents, he gives a vivid picture not only of his own mind, but of the age and its peculiar characteristics. Because there was no distinct line between personal documents and those meant for publication, we frequently find in his letters both confidential messages and treatises meant for others besides the one to whom he was writing.

Due to the time he spent in Rome among wealthy families belonging to the Roman upper-class, Jerome was frequently commissioned by women who had taken a vow of virginity to write to them in guidance of how to live their life. As a result, he spent a great deal of his life corresponding with these women about certain abstentions and lifestyle practices.

Theological writings

Eschatology 

Jerome warned that those substituting false interpretations for the actual meaning of Scripture belonged to the "synagogue of the Antichrist". To Jerome, the power restraining this mystery of iniquity was the Roman Empire, but as it fell this restraining force was removed. He warned a noblewoman of Gaul:

He that letteth is taken out of the way, and yet we do not realize that Antichrist is near. Yes, Antichrist is near whom the Lord Jesus Christ "shall consume with the spirit of his mouth". "Woe unto them," he cries, "that are with child, and to them that give suck in those days." ... Savage tribes in countless numbers have overrun all parts of Gaul. The whole country between the Alps and the Pyrenees, between the Rhine and the Ocean, has been laid waste by hordes of Quadi, Vandals, Sarmatians, Alans, Gepids, Herules, Saxons, Burgundians, Allemanni, and – alas! for the commonweal! – even Pannonians.

His Commentary on Daniel was expressly written to offset the criticisms of Porphyry, who taught that Daniel related entirely to the time of Antiochus IV Epiphanes and was written by an unknown individual living in the second century BC. Against Porphyry, Jerome identified Rome as the fourth kingdom of chapters two and seven, but his view of chapters eight and eleven was more complex. Jerome held that chapter eight describes the activity of Antiochus Epiphanes, who is understood as a "type" of a future antichrist; 11:24 onwards applies primarily to a future antichrist but was partially fulfilled by Antiochus. Instead, he advocated that the "little horn" was the Antichrist:

We should therefore concur with the traditional interpretation of all the commentators of the Christian Church, that at the end of the world, when the Roman Empire is to be destroyed, there shall be ten kings who will partition the Roman world amongst themselves. Then an insignificant eleventh king will arise, who will overcome three of the ten kings. ... After they have been slain, the seven other kings also will bow their necks to the victor.

In his Commentary on Daniel, he noted, "Let us not follow the opinion of some commentators and suppose him to be either the Devil or some demon, but rather, one of the human race, in whom Satan will wholly take up his residence in bodily form." Instead of rebuilding the Jewish Temple to reign from, Jerome thought the Antichrist sat in God's Temple inasmuch as he made "himself out to be like God."

Jerome identified the four prophetic kingdoms symbolized in Daniel 2 as the Neo-Babylonian Empire, the Medes and Persians, Macedon, and Rome. Jerome identified the stone cut out without hands as "namely, the Lord and Savior".

Jerome refuted Porphyry's application of the little horn of chapter seven to Antiochus. He expected that at the end of the world, Rome would be destroyed, and partitioned among ten kingdoms before the little horn appeared.

Jerome believed that Cyrus of Persia is the higher of the two horns of the Medo-Persian ram of Daniel 8:3. The he-goat is Greece smiting Persia.

Reception by later Christianity 

Jerome is the second-most voluminous writer – after Augustine of Hippo (354–430) – in ancient Latin Christianity. The Catholic Church recognizes him as the patron saint of translators, librarians, and encyclopedists.

Jerome translated many biblical texts into Latin from Hebrew, Aramaic, and Greek. His translations formed part of the Vulgate; the Vulgate eventually superseded the preceding Latin translations of the Bible (the Vetus Latina). The Council of Trent in 1546 declared the Vulgate authoritative "in public lectures, disputations, sermons, and expositions".

Jerome showed more zeal and interest in the ascetic ideal than in abstract speculation. He lived as an ascetic for 4~5 years in the Syrian desert, and later near Bethlehem for 34 years. Nevertheless, his writings show outstanding scholarship and his correspondence has great historical importance.

The Church of England honours Jerome with a commemoration on 30 September.

In art 
Jerome is also often depicted with a lion, in reference to the popular hagiographical belief that Jerome had tamed a lion in the wilderness by healing its paw. The source for the story may actually have been the second century Roman tale of Androcles, or confusion with the exploits of Gerasimus (Jerome in later Latin is "Geronimus"); it is "a figment" found in the thirteenth-century Golden Legend by Jacobus de Voragine. Hagiographies of Jerome talk of his having spent many years in the Syrian desert, and artists often depict him in a "wilderness", which for West European painters can take the form of a wood.

From the late Middle Ages, depictions of Jerome in a wider setting became popular. He is either shown in his study, surrounded by books and the equipment of a scholar, or in a rocky desert, or in a setting that combines both aspects, with him studying a book under the shelter of a rock-face or cave mouth. His study is often shown as large and well-provided for, he is often clean-shaven and well-dressed, and a cardinal's hat may appear. These images derive from the tradition of the evangelist portrait, though Jerome is often given the library and desk of a serious scholar. His attribute of the lion, often shown at a smaller scale, may be beside him in either setting. The subject of "Jerome Penitent" first appears in the later 15th century in Italy; he is usually in the desert, wearing ragged clothes, and often naked above the waist. His gaze is usually fixed on a crucifix and he may beat himself with his fist or a rock.

Jerome is often depicted in connection with the vanitas motif, the reflection on the meaninglessness of earthly life and the transient nature of all earthly goods and pursuits. In the 16th century Saint Jerome in his study by Pieter Coecke van Aelst and workshop, the saint is depicted with a skull. Behind him on the wall is pinned an admonition, Cogita Mori ("Think upon death"). Further reminders of the vanitas motif of the passage of time and the imminence of death are the image of the Last Judgment visible in the saint's Bible, the candle and the hourglass.

Jerome is also sometimes depicted with an owl, the symbol of wisdom and scholarship. Writing materials and the trumpet of final judgment are also part of his iconography.

See also 

 Bible translations
 Church Fathers
 Eusebius of Cremona
 Ferdinand Cavallera
 Genesius of Arles
 International Translation Day
 Letter of Jerome to Pope Damasus
 Order of St. Jerome
 Prologus Galeatus

References

Notes

Citations

Sources

 Andrew Cain and Josef Lössl, Jerome of Stridon: His Life, Writings and Legacy (London and New York, 2009)
 
 
 
 
 
 
 
 
 
 
 
 
 
 
 
 Biblia Sacra Vulgata [e.g. edition published Stuttgart, 1994, ]
 This article uses material from the Schaff–Herzog Encyclopedia of Religious Knowledge.

Further reading 

 Saint Jerome, Three biographies: Malchus, St. Hilarion and Paulus the First Hermit Authored by Saint Jerome, London, 2012. limovia.net.

External links 

 St. Jerome (pdf) from Fr. Alban Butler's Lives of the Saints
 The Life of St. Jerome, Priest, Confessor and Doctor of the Church
 
 Jewish Encyclopedia: Jerome
 St. Jerome – Catholic Online
 St Jerome (Hieronymus) of Stridonium Orthodox synaxarion
 Further reading of depictions of Saint Jerome in art
 Saint Jerome, Doctor of the Church at the Christian Iconography web site
 Here Followeth the Life of Jerome from Caxton's translation of the Golden Legend
 Works of Saint Jerome at Somni
 Beati Hyeronimi Epistolarum liber, digitized codex (1464)
 Epistole de santo Geronimo traducte di latino, digitized codex (1475–1490)
 Hieronymi in Danielem, digitized codex (1490)
 Sancti Hieronymi ad Pammachium in duodecim prophetas, digitized codex (1470–1480)
 Colonnade Statue in St Peter's Square

Latin texts 
 Chronological list of Jerome's Works with modern editions and translations cited
 Opera Omnia (Complete Works) from Migne edition (Patrologia Latina, 1844–1855) with analytical indexes, almost complete online edition
 Lewis E 82 Vitae patrum (Lives of the Fathers) at OPenn
 Lewis E 47 Bible Commentary at OPenn

Facsimiles 
 Migne volume 23 part 1 (1883 edition)
 Migne volume 23 part 2 (1883 edition)
 Migne volume 24 (1845 edition)
 Migne volume 25 part 1 (1884 edition)
 Migne volume 25 part 2 (1884 edition)
 Migne volume 28 (1890 edition?)
 Migne volume 30 (1865 edition)

English translations 
 
 English translations of Biblical Prefaces, Commentary on Daniel, Chronicle, and Letter 120 (tertullian.org)
 Jerome's Letter to Pope Damasus: Preface to the Gospels
 English translation of Jerome's De Viris Illustribus
 Translations of various works (letters, biblical prefaces, life of St. Hilarion, others) (under "Jerome")
 Lives of Famous Men (CCEL)
 Apology Against Rufinus (CCEL)
 Letters, The Life of Paulus the First Hermit, The Life of S. Hilarion, The Life of Malchus, the Captive Monk, The Dialogue Against the Luciferians, The Perpetual Virginity of Blessed Mary, Against Jovinianus, Against Vigilantius, To Pammachius against John of Jerusalem, Against the Pelagians, Prefaces (CCEL)
 Audiobook of some of the letters

 
340s births
420 deaths
4th-century Christian theologians
4th-century historians
4th-century Latin writers
4th-century Romans
4th-century translators
5th-century Christian saints
5th-century Latin writers
5th-century Romans
5th-century translators
Anglican saints
Christian apologists
Christian hagiographers
Christian writers about eschatology
Chronologists
Church Fathers
Doctors of the Church
Hieronymite Order
Holy Land travellers
Illyrian people
Latin letter writers
People from Roman Dalmatia
Translation scholars
Translators of the Bible into Latin
Year of birth uncertain
Translation theorists